Michiya (written: 道哉  or 美智也) is a masculine Japanese given name. Notable people with the name include:

 (born 1966), Japanese guitarist
 (1930–1996), Japanese singer

Japanese masculine given names